SWX may refer to:

 SIX Swiss Exchange (SWX Swiss Exchange) Zurich, Switzerland stock exchange (SWX)
 SWX Europe, crossborder trading platform
 SWX Group, conglomerate behind the SWX stock exchange
 SWX Right Now, sports TV channel for varsity and collegiate sports
 .swx, file format and file extension for Adobe Flash
 Shakawe Airport (IATA airport code: SWX, ICAO airport code: FBSW) airport in Shakawe, Botswana
 Swazi Express Airways (IATA airline code: Q4, ICAO airline code: SWX) defunct airline of Swaziland
 Zuruahá language (ISO 639 language code: swx) Suruahá
 Saidanwala rail station (rail code: SWX) see Ludhiana–Fazilka line
 Southwest Gas (NYSE stock ticker: SWX) Las Vegas natural gas utility company